Aoyuncun Subdistrict is a subdistrict on the northwestern corner of Chaoyang District, Beijing, China. It borders Dongsheng Township and Dongxiaokou Town to the north, Laiguangying Township to the east, Yayuncun and Datun Subdistricts to the south, and Haidian District to the west. As of 2020, it has a total population of 109,688.

The subdistrict got the current name Aoyuncun due to the Beijing Olympic Village located within it.

History

Administrative Division 
At the end of 2021, there are 16 communities under Aoyuncun Subdistrict:

Landmarks 

 Olympic Forest Park
 Beijing National Stadium
 Beijing National Aquatics Center

References 

Chaoyang District, Beijing
Subdistricts of Beijing